The Dr. H. Huber Block was a historic commercial building in downtown Ottawa, Ohio, United States.  Built in 1882, it was erected for Dr. Hubert Huber, a native of Germany who immigrated to the nearby village of Glandorf in 1853.  This Italianate three-story brick building is typical of many commercial buildings constructed in villages such as Ottawa in the late nineteenth century: as prosperity increased, building owners sought to rebuild their structures in the style of those in large cities.  Besides maintaining a medical practice in the building, Huber also operated a pharmacy on the first story that continued in operation long after his death; the second floor consisted of residential apartments that he rented out to others, and the third floor was used for nearly a century as a meeting place for the local Knights of Columbus lodge.

In 1980, the Huber Block was listed on the National Register of Historic Places.  It qualified for inclusion because of its well-preserved historic architecture, which was seen as significant in the local community. Building was torn down in 2015 due to the 2007 flood damages.

References

Commercial buildings completed in 1882
Italianate architecture in Ohio
Commercial buildings on the National Register of Historic Places in Ohio
Residential buildings on the National Register of Historic Places in Ohio
Buildings and structures in Putnam County, Ohio
National Register of Historic Places in Putnam County, Ohio
Knights of Columbus buildings in the United States
Defunct pharmacies of the United States
Apartment buildings in Ohio
Clubhouses in Ohio
Health care companies based in Ohio
Demolished buildings and structures in Ohio
Buildings and structures demolished in 2015
Pharmacies on the National Register of Historic Places
Demolished but still listed on the National Register of Historic Places